Mas (legally Aerotransportes Mas de Carga, S.A. de C.V.) is a cargo airline based in Mexico City, Mexico, specialized in the shipment of air freight. It operates scheduled cargo services in Mexico and to the United States, Ecuador and Colombia. Its main base is Mexico City International Airport, with secondary hubs at Los Angeles and Miami.

History
The airline was established as Mas Air in 1992 and started operations in April of the same year, providing air cargo services to clients principally in Latin America and the United States, operating over 600 flights which move near 60,000 tons of air cargo annually. In December 2000, LAN Airlines purchased a 25% stake in Mas Air.

In August 2015, it was announced that all LATAM Airlines Group airlines would fully rebrand as LATAM, and Mas Air was rebranded as LATAM Cargo Mexico on May 5, 2016. On December 1, 2018, the LATAM Group sold its 39.5% shares of LATAM Cargo Mexico, rebranding it back as Mas Air; the latter now operates independently from LATAM.

In April 2021, Mas Air announced the lease of two Airbus A330-200/P2F during the first quarter of 2022. The company reported the investment of more than $5 million dollars in the hiring and training of crew and technical personnel to operate the aircraft. In May 2021, it announced the lease of two additional Airbus A330-300/P2F aircraft.

In December 2022, Mas purchase a 49% stake in Maltese charter Galistair Malta.

Destinations

Mas Air operates the following scheduled services:

Fleet

Current fleet

Mas Air's fleet consists of the following aircraft (as of November 2022):

Former fleet
Mas Air formerly operated the following aircraft:

See also
List of airlines of Mexico

References

External links

Airlines established in 1992
Airlines of Mexico
Cargo airlines of Mexico
Airlines of Mexico City
1992 establishments in Mexico